Andrew Zelig Stone, Baron Stone of Blackheath (born 7 September 1942) is a Labour member of the House of Lords.

He retired as joint managing director of Marks and Spencer plc in 1999.

He is currently a director of several non-government organisations, a retail company and is involved in several charities. He also chairs the charity DIPEx that helps patients gain information on their condition and their options.

In October 2019, he was suspended from the Labour peers group.

Professional career
He joined Marks and Spencer as a trainee in 1966 and retired from his position as joint managing director of the company in 1999.

He is currently a director of N Brown Group plc. He was the non-executive chairman of Deal Group Media plc until 2007, when he resigned from this position. He is an advisory board member of The Next Century Foundation.

He is chairman of Sindicatum Climate Change Foundation and chairman of The DIPEx Charity, a charitable health organisation. He is a governor of the Weizmann Institute of Science and honorary vice president of The Movement for Reform Judaism.
He is a patron of the Institute for Jewish Policy Research, the Gauchers Association, the New Israel Fund, the Jewish Chernobyl Children, the Orphaids charity, The Forgiveness Project (as of 2004) and LEAD Nepal – Development for the future of Nepalese Youth. He is a trustee of Prism the Gift Fund and formerly a trustee of the Olive Tree Educational Trust (now The Olive Tree Scholarship Programme at City University).

He is also the host and convenor of the annual awards of the International Media Council (now part of the International Council for Press and Broadcasting) based in London.

Political career
He was created a life peer as Baron Stone of Blackheath, of Blackheath in the London Borough of Greenwich on 29 October 1997.
He has voted strongly for the introduction of a smoking ban and for gay rights. He is a working Labour peer and does not usually rebel against his party. However, he has repeatedly voted against the party on House of Lords reform as well as on the Prevention of Terrorism Bill and the Hunting Bill.

He has listed his political interests as conflict resolution, art and science, health and ecology.

In October 2019, he was suspended from the Labour peers group after the House of Lords standards committee found that he had harassed four female colleagues and made transphobic remarks. He also repeatedly used the N-word in evidence to the commissioner in a bid to defend his conduct.

Memberships
Lord Stone is a member of the International Trade Council. He is a member of Labour Friends of Israel.

Personal life
Lord Stone met his wife, Wendy, when both worked for Marks & Spencer: they are now separated. They share a birthday, with Wendy being five years younger. Their children are Daniel, Jessica and Susie, and they have two grandchildren.

Arms

References

1942 births
Living people
Stone of Blackheath
Life peers created by Elizabeth II
Place of birth missing (living people)
Jewish British politicians
Labour Friends of Israel